Verdict of the Sea is a 1932 British adventure film directed by Frank Miller and Sidney Northcote and starring John Stuart, Moira Lynd and Cyril McLaglen. It was made at Elstree Studios and on location by British International Pictures, the largest British film company at the time. It was based on a novel by Alan Sullivan. The film's sets were designed by David Rawnsley.

Plot
Fenn, the domineering second officer of a merchant ship, is attempting to recruit an extra hand in the London docks for a voyage to Singapore but due to his harsh reputation he can find no volunteers. Eventually he manages to persuade a drunken, middle-class man who has apparently fallen down on his luck to sign on to the ship. Aboard ship the well-spoken "Gentleman" Burton attracts the interest of the captain's daughter Paddy who is curious at his mysterious past. This enrages Fenn who is desperate to marry her, despite her dislike of his rough manners, and he tries to bribe Burton to desert at their first port of call to remove a rival for her love. When Burton refuses to do so, Fenn arranges for local criminals to kidnap him, but is compelled by Paddy to rescue him, which he successfully does.

When the ship arrives at an island to take on supplies, the ship becomes embroiled in a plan by a group of British criminals living on the island to steal some diamonds from a local shopkeeper. The captain agrees to carry the diamonds to safety in Singapore, but the criminals board and take over the ship to get their hands on the diamonds, threatening to kill the surviving crew. Fenn and Burton join forces to repulse the boarders and the ship gets safely to Singapore where Burton and Paddy agree to marry, after he reveals that he quit his previous life as a respectable doctor due to a woman. Meanwhile Fenn leaves to look for command of a ship of his own.

Cast
 John Stuart as Gentleman Burton  
 Moira Lynd as Paddy  
 Cyril McLaglen as Fenn  
 David Miller as Captain  
 Hal Walters as Shorty  
 Harold Saxon-Snell as Myers  
 Bill Shine as Slim  
 Fred Rains as Martin

References

Bibliography
 Low, Rachael. Filmmaking in 1930s Britain. George Allen & Unwin, 1985.
 Wood, Linda. British Films, 1927-1939. British Film Institute, 1986.

External links

1932 films
British adventure films
1932 adventure films
1930s English-language films
Films shot at British International Pictures Studios
Seafaring films
Films set in London
Films set in Singapore
British black-and-white films
1930s British films